The Spell of Iron MMXI is the ninth album by Finnish heavy metal band Tarot, released on 11 April 2011. It is a re-recording of the band's 1986 debut album for its 25th anniversary. It is the final album to feature Pecu Cinnari before his death, and Marko Hietala before his retirement from the public eye in 2021.

Track listing 
 "Midwinter Nights" - 4:15
 "Dancing on the Wire" - 3:34
 "Back in the Fire" - 4:58
 "Love's Not Made for My Kind" - 6:20
 "Never Forever" - 2:50
 "The Spell of Iron" - 4:38
 "De Mortui Nil Nisi Bene" - 3:35
 "Pharao" - 3:26
 "Wings of Darkness" - 3:27
 "Things That Crawl at Night" - 5:03
Bonus track
 "I Walk Forever" (Live) - 5:26

Personnel 
 Marko Hietala – lead vocals, bass, acoustic guitar
 Zachary Hietala – guitars
 Janne Tolsa – keyboards
 Pecu Cinnari – drums
 Tommi Salmela – samples, co-lead vocals, backing vocals

Charts

References

Tarot (band) albums
2011 albums